Presly is a commune in the Cher department in the Centre-Val de Loire region of France.

Geography

The river Rère has its source near the hamlet of Sommerère in the southeastern part of the commune. It flows northwest through the middle of the commune, enters the territory of Ménétréol-sur-Sauldre and flows back southwest in the northwestern part of Presly.

Population

Sights
 The church of St. Caprais, dating from the thirteenth century.
 The seventeenth-century chateau La Planche.

See also
Communes of the Cher department

References

Communes of Cher (department)